József Balla (27 July 1955 – 18 March 2003) was a heavyweight freestyle wrestler from Hungary. He won silver medals at the 1976 and 1980 Olympics, 1985 World Championships, and 1975, 1978 and 1981 European championships. He won the European championships in 1983.

Personal life
Balla was born in Szőreg on 27 July 1955. He died in Kecskemét on 17 March 2003.

References

External links

1955 births
2003 deaths
Sportspeople from Csongrád-Csanád County
Olympic wrestlers of Hungary
Wrestlers at the 1976 Summer Olympics
Wrestlers at the 1980 Summer Olympics
Hungarian male sport wrestlers
Olympic silver medalists for Hungary
Olympic medalists in wrestling
Medalists at the 1980 Summer Olympics
Medalists at the 1976 Summer Olympics
20th-century Hungarian people
21st-century Hungarian people